Lu Wei-chih (born 19 March 1979) is a Taiwanese professional golfer.

Lu plays on the Asian Tour, where he has won three times and on the Japan Golf Tour. He has represented Taiwan twice in the World Cup.

Professional wins (5)

Asian Tour wins (4)

Japan Challenge Tour wins (1)

Team appearances
Amateur
Eisenhower Trophy (representing Taiwan): 2000

Professional
World Cup (representing Taiwan): 2004, 2009

External links

Taiwanese male golfers
Asian Tour golfers
Japan Golf Tour golfers
1979 births
Living people